Frederick Augustus Porter Barnard (May 5, 1809 – April 27, 1889) was an American academic and educator who served as the 10th President of Columbia University. Born in Sheffield, Massachusetts, he graduated from Yale University in 1828 and served in a succession of academic appointments, including as Chancellor of the University of Mississippi from 1856 to 1861. He assumed office as President of Columbia University in 1864, where he presided over a series of improvements to the university until his death in 1889. He was also known as an author of academic texts.

Early life

He was born on May 5, 1809, in Sheffield, Massachusetts. His brother, John G. Barnard, was a career officer in the U.S. Army who served as the superintendent of the United States Military Academy and later as a general in the Union Army during the American Civil War. Barnard had a hereditary form of deafness that intensified in his later years, along with his brother and most of his family.

He graduated from Yale University in 1828, where he pursued astronomical studies and was a member of the Linonian Society.

Career
Barnard became a tutor at Yale following his graduation in 1828. He later served as a teacher at the American Asylum for the Deaf and Dumb at Hartford, Connecticut between 1831 and 1832, and at the New York Institute for the Instruction of the Deaf and Dumb between 1832 and 1838.

He taught at the University of Alabama in various capacities from 1838 to 1854, where he was a professor of mathematics and natural philosophy until 1848, and a professor of chemistry and natural history thereafter. He also filled the chair of English literature during his time at the university.

Barnard was ordained as a deacon in the Protestant Episcopal Church in 1854. In the same year he took up position as a professor of mathematics and natural philosophy at the University of Mississippi, where he eventually assumed the office of chancellor from 1856 through to the outbreak of the American Civil War in 1861, when he resigned due to his Unionist sympathies. During his time at the university he was subject to scrutiny from the board of trustees for taking the testimony of a slave against that of a student who had allegedly assaulted her.

He was sent to Labrador in 1860 to observe an eclipse of the sun; in 1862 he worked on the reduction of Gilliss's observations of stars in the Southern Hemisphere, and in 1863 he supervised the publication of maps and charts of the United States Coastal Survey. He was elected as an Associate Fellow of the American Academy of Arts and Sciences in 1860; as president of the American Association for the Advancement of Science in 1866, as a member of the Board of Experts of the American Bureau of Mines in 1865, and as a member of the American Institute in 1872. He also gained membership in the American Philosophical Society in 1871.

Columbia College
He served as the 10th President of Columbia College (now Columbia University) in New York City, holding office for an unprecedented term of 25 years from 1864 to 1889 - longer than that of any of his predecessors. During this period the college experienced rapid growth. New departments were established; the elective system was greatly extended, greater provisions were made for graduate study and original research, and enrolment increased from approximately 150 students to over 1000.

Barnard himself served as a scholar of English and the classics, and as an expert in the fields of mathematics, physics, and chemistry. He was known as a skilled public speaker, with his annual reports to the Board of Trustees including valuable discussions of educational problems.

He also served as the co-editor-in-chief of Johnson's New Universal Cyclopaedia (1876), alongside Arnold Henry Guyot. Other texts authored by Barnard, include Treatise on Arithmetic (1830), Analytical Grammar with Symbolic Illustration (1836), Letters on Collegiate Government (1855), History of the United States Coast Survey (1857), Recent Progress in Science (1869), and The Metric System (1871).

He died on April 27, 1889, in New York City. In his will, the bulk of his estate was left to Columbia College.

Legacy

Barnard strove to extend educational privileges to women that were normally reserved for men, and the establishment of Barnard Women's College, following his death, was done so in his honor.

Barnard Observatory, one of the few buildings of the University of Mississippi that survived the American Civil War, is also named in his honor.

Barnard Medal for Meritorious Service to Science

The Barnard Medal for Meritorious Service to Science was established in 1889 according to the instructions of his will, and has been awarded by Columbia University every five years, beginning in 1895.

Writings

See also
Presidents of the American Association for the Advancement of Science

References

External links

F. A. P. Barnard Collection (MUM00519), at The University of Mississippi, Archive and Special Collections
National Academy of Sciences Biographical Memoir
Finding aid to Frederick A.P. Barnard papers at Columbia University. Rare Book & Manuscript Library.
 

1809 births
1889 deaths
University of Mississippi faculty
Presidents of Columbia University
Yale University alumni
Fellows of the American Academy of Arts and Sciences
Members of the United States National Academy of Sciences
People from Sheffield, Massachusetts
Educators of the deaf
Deaf religious workers
American deaf people
Scientists with disabilities